The Baby Automag is a small semi-automatic handgun that was produced by Arcadia Machine & Tool. Precisely 1,000 were manufactured in stainless steel with a smooth walnut grip.

References 

AMT semi-automatic pistols
Semi-auto magnum pistols
.22 LR pistols